The men's 200 metre butterfly competition of the swimming events at the 1971 Pan American Games took place on 8 August.  The last Pan American Games champion was Mark Spitz of US.

This race consisted of four lengths of the pool, all lengths being in butterfly stroke.

At this race, two swimmers won the first medals of their countries in swimming at Pan American Games at all times: Jorge Delgado got the gold for Ecuador, and Augusto González, the bronze for Peru.

Results
All times are in minutes and seconds.

Heats

Final 
The final was held on August 8.

References

Swimming at the 1971 Pan American Games